Weed is the tenth album by singer-songwriter and guitarist, Chris Whitley. It is his eighth studio album.

The album is Whitley's acoustic re-recording of a selection of songs he wrote from 1986 to 1996 for his three recordings on Columbia / Work Records: Living with the Law (1991), Din of Ecstasy (1995), and Terra Incognita (1997).

It was produced and recorded by Chris Whitley live to a two-track MD in Susann Bürger's bathroom / Sebnitzer Straße and Space House / Katharinenstraße in Dresden, Germany.

Track listing
All tracks written by Chris Whitley:

 "Power Down" – 3:43
 "Living with the Law" – 4:05
 "Know" – 3:16
 "Phone Call from Leavenworth" – 4:22
 "Cool Wooden Crosses" – 2:44
 "Big Sky Country" – 4:26
 "New Machine" – 3:19
 "Clear Blue Sky" – 4:36
 "Bordertown" – 3:16
 "Narcotic Prayer" – 3:42
 "Kick the Stones" – 4:11
 "Weightless" – 2:37
 "I Forget You Everyday" – 4:20
 "Make the Dirt Stick" – 3:33
 "Dust Radio" – 3:22
 "Can't Get Off (instrumental)" – 3:57

Personnel 
Chris Whitley – vocals, guitar, and foot stomp

References

2004 albums
Chris Whitley albums
Messenger Records albums